Indonesia participated in the 2006 Asian Games held in the city of Doha, Qatar from 1 December 2006 to 15 December 2006. Indonesia ranked 20th with 2 gold medals in this edition of the Asiad.

Competitors

Medal summary

Medal table

Medalists

Archery

Men

Women

Badminton

Men
Team

Individual

Women
Team

Individual

Mixed

Beach volleyball

Men

Bodybuilding

Men
* Syafrizaldy originally won the bronze medal, but Sayed Faisal Husain of Bahrain the original silver medalist was disqualified after he failed the drug test.

Bowling

Men

Women

Canoeing

Men

Women

Chess

Men

Women

Mixed

Cue Sports

Men

Cycling

Road
Men

Women

Track
Keirin

Pursuit

Omnium

Equestrian

Eventing

Football

Men's tournament

Round 1

Group B

Judo

Men

Karate

Legend
KK – Forfeit (Kiken)

Men

Women

Rowing

Men

Women

Sailing

Men

Sepaktakraw

Men

Taekwondo

Legend
K – Won by knockout

Men

Women

Tennis

Women

Weightlifting 

Men

Women

 Sinta Darmariani originally place fourth in Women's -75 kg but Mya Sanda Oo of Myanmar who originally won the silver medal, was disqualified after she tested positive for Metabolite.

Wushu

Men's Taolu

Women's Taolu

References

Nations at the 2006 Asian Games
2006
Asian Games